American Specialties is the debut studio album by American indie rock band Parquet Courts, initially released in 2011 as a limited edition cassette on Cut the Cord That... Records. A vinyl version of the album was subsequently released on Pinball! Records in 2012.

The album was partly mixed by Woods multi-instrumentalist Jarvis Taveniere.

Recording
In 2016, vocalist and guitarist Andrew Savage noted that the album stands mostly alone within the band's discography, in terms of its songwriting and overall aesthetic: "There’s a lot of stuff on American Specialties that didn’t really get revisited in the band, although its essence has informed everything the band has done."

Release
Regarding American Specialties initial release on cassette, vocalist and guitarist Andrew Savage noted, "Cassettes force you to be patient and digest what you're listening to. People that are curious and go out and search for music are listening to cassettes because maybe there's only a hundred of them – and that's all the more incentive because they'd like to hear it before it becomes completely unavailable. I like to reward people's curiosity."

Track listing

Personnel
Parquet Courts
 Austin Brown – vocals, guitar
 Andrew Savage – vocals, guitar
 Sean Yeaton – bass guitar 
 Max Savage – drums

Recording personnel
 Parquet Courts – recording
 Jarvis Taveniere – mixing
 Jason Kelly – mixing
 David Willingham – mastering

References

2011 debut albums
Parquet Courts albums